Salem Abdulrahman Mohamed Saleh (born 4 January 1993) is an Emirati chess player. He was awarded the title of Grandmaster by FIDE in 2009. Saleh competed in the FIDE World Cup in 2011, 2013 and 2015.

Biography 
Born in Sharjah, Saleh won three titles at the Asian Youth Chess Championships: under 14 in 2007, under 16 in 2008, and under 18 in 2009. He won the Emirati Chess Championship in 2008, 2011 and 2012, and the Arab Chess Championship in 2008, 2014 and 2018. Salem Saleh won the Arab Individual Blitz Chess Championship 2017 and 2018. In August 2015, in Al Ain, he won both the Asian Chess Championship and the Asian blitz chess championship. In 2017, he finished in a tie for first place in the 1st Sharjah Masters international championship with Wang Hao. B. Adhiban, Martyn Kravtsiv, Yuriy Kryvoruchko and S. P. Sethuraman.

Saleh has played for the UAE's national team on the top board in every Chess Olympiad from 2008 to 2016. He also participated in the Asian Nations Cup in 2016.

In August 2021, Saleh won the 2020 Biel MTO edition with a score of 7.0/9 and a rating performance of 2790.

In April 2022, Saleh won the 27th Sharjah International Rapid with a score of 8.0/9

References

External links
 
 
 
 
  (2002–2003) 
 

1993 births
Living people
Chess grandmasters
Chess players at the 2010 Asian Games
Emirati chess players
People from the Emirate of Sharjah
Asian Games competitors for the United Arab Emirates